Leslie James Fell (16 December 1920 – 9 October 2010) was an English footballer who played as a winger in the Football League.

He was known as 'Lightning Les' for his bursts of speed whilst playing for Charlton Athletic. The highlight of his football career was his appearance in the 1946 FA Cup final for Charlton where he played in the position of outside-right.

References

External links

1920 births
2010 deaths
English footballers
Footballers from Stepney
Association football wingers
Gravesend United F.C. players
Charlton Athletic F.C. players
Crystal Palace F.C. players
Margate F.C. players
English Football League players
FA Cup Final players